Ghana–Nigeria relations are the bilateral diplomatic relations between Ghana and Nigeria.

Colonial
The colonial era increased the relationship between both countries. Both Nigeria and Ghana were colonized by the British Empire. This colonization gave the countries, which share no common language, a means of communication. This era also brought some Nigerians to Ghana. During the Colonial era, descendants of Nigerian Hausas were brought to the Gold Coast, what is now Ghana, to fight under the British flag in an attempt to destroy one of the last holdouts against British rule in West Africa, the Ashanti Empire. They were called Glover Hausas and contributed to the foundations of the Gold Coast's colonial army.

Post-colonial
Many Nigerians began moving to Ghana after Ghana became the first independent country in the region in 1957. Also in the late 1970s many Ghanaians moved to Nigeria as economic migrants. The relationship became sour for various reasons. Thus, under former Ghanaian prime minister Kofi Abrefa Busia's Aliens Compliance Order, Nigerians among other immigrants were forced to leave Ghana as they made up a significant percentage of Ghana's large undocumented population. The official reason for deportation was failing to comply with the immigration laws of the country.

In 1983, Nigeria retaliated and deported up to 1 million Ghanaian and other African immigrants when Ghana was facing severe drought and economic problems. This further strained relations between the two countries. In April 1988, a joint commission for cooperation was established between Ghana and Nigeria. A bloodless coup in August 1985 had brought Major General Ibrahim Babangida to power in Nigeria, and Rawlings, the leader of Ghana at the time,  took advantage of the change of administration to pay an official visit. The two leaders discussed a wide range of issues focusing on peace and prosperity within West Africa, bilateral trade, and the transition to democracy in both countries. In early January 1989, Babangida reciprocated with an official visit to Ghana, which the PNDC hailed as a watershed in Ghana–Nigeria relations.

Subsequent setbacks that Babangida initiated in the democratic transition process in Nigeria clearly disappointed Accra. Nonetheless, the political crisis that followed Babangida's annulment of the results of the June 1993 Nigerian presidential election and Babangida's resignation from the army and presidency two months later did not significantly alter the existing close relations between Ghana and Nigeria, two of the most important members of ECOWAS. After the takeover in November 1993 by General Sani Abacha as the new Nigerian head of state Nigeria continued to consult Ghana on economic, political, and security issues affecting the two countries and West Africa as a whole.  Between early August 1994 when Ghanaian President Jerry Rawlings became ECOWAS chairman and the end of the following October, the Ghanaian president visited Nigeria three times to discuss the peace process in Liberia and measures to restore democracy in that country.

See also

 Nigerian High Commission in Ghana

References

 
Nigeria
Bilateral relations of Nigeria